is a train station located in Tachiarai, Fukuoka.

Lines
Nishi-Nippon Railroad
Amagi Line

Platforms

Adjacent stations

Surrounding area 
 Hongō Elementary School
 Hongō Nursery
 Tachiarai Post Office

Railway stations in Fukuoka Prefecture
Railway stations in Japan opened in 1921